is a Japanese manga series written and illustrated by Yama Wayama. It has been serialized in Shodensha's josei manga magazine Feel Young since January 2020, with its chapters collected into three tankōbon volumes as of December 2022. An original video animation adaptation by Lapin Track was released in December 2022. As of December 2022, the manga had over 1.6 million copies in circulation.

Synopsis
The series follows the everyday life of Hoshi, a male Japanese language teacher at an all-girls school. His various exploits are examined in a slice of life format, such as looking after the class pet dog, giving advice to students, and drinking with his co-workers.

Characters

A Japanese language teacher at an all-girls school.

A teacher at the school where Hoshi works, and friend to Hoshi.

A student in Hoshi's class.

Media

Manga
Written and illustrated by Yama Wayama, Onna no Sono no Hoshi began serialization in Shodensha's josei manga magazine Feel Young on January 8, 2020. As of December 2022, three tankōbon volumes have been released.

Volume list

Original video animation
In August 2022, it was announced that the manga would be adapted into an original video animation (OVA). It was produced by Lapin Track and directed by Mamoru Hatakeyama, with scripts written by Teruko Utsumi, character designs handled by Naho Kozono, who also served as chief animation director, and music composed by Kei Haneoka. The OVA is in a Blu-ray Disc that was bundled with a special edition of the manga's third volume, which was released on December 8, 2022.

Reception
By December 2022, Onna no Sono no Hoshi had over 1.6 million copies in circulation. The series ranked ninth on the 2020 "Book of the Year" list by Da Vinci magazine; it ranked sixth on the 2021 list. It topped Takarajimasha's Kono Manga ga Sugoi! 2021 list of best manga for female readers; it also ranked fifth on the 2022 list. The series ranked seventh in the 14th Manga Taishō in 2021; it ranked fourth in the 15th edition in 2022; it was also nominated in the 16th edition in 2023. The series ranked fourth in the 2021 Next Manga Award in the print category. It won the Social Impact Award in the manga division at the 25th Japan Media Arts Festival in 2022.

References

External links
  
  
 

Comedy anime and manga
Josei manga
OVAs based on manga
Shodensha manga